Louis François Fernand Hector de Loys (1892–1935) was a Swiss oil geologist. He is remembered today for the claim that he discovered a previously unknown primate, De Loys's ape, during a 1920 oil survey expedition in Venezuela. The identity of the animal he photographed has long been established with considerable confidence to be a spider monkey, and the identification as a new species is generally regarded as a hoax.

History
Between 1917–1920, de Loys and his men were searching for oil around the River Tarra and Rio Catatumbo at the Venezuela–Colombia border in South America (Bernard Heuvelmans, 1959). This mountainous region, the Sierra de Perijaa, was heavily forested, and that time was inhabited by the 'dangerous' "Motilone Indians".

One day, while de Loys and his crew were resting near the Tarra River deep in the jungle, two monkeys suddenly stepped out of the woods, screaming and shaking branches. They were holding onto bushes, walked upright, then broke off several branches, waving them like weapons. When the monkeys threw their own excrement at the terrified de Loys and his exhausted companions, they grabbed their guns and fired at the more aggressive-looking male, but killed the female. The male stepped aside, though wounded, and disappeared in the forest.

Since de Loys and his people had never seen such large monkeys, he wanted to preserve the carcass. When de Loys finally returned home with the only remaining evidence, a picture which he had placed into his travel-notebook, he basically forgot about his encounter with the unknown monkeys. Years later his friend, French anthropologist George Montandon, flipped the pages of de Loys' notebook, and discovered the photo.Although Professor Montandon was familiar with most of the monkeys discovered to that date, he had never seen one like that in de Loys' picture. Montandon speculated that the large monkey in the picture was a very human-like creature. It had no tail. Its size, according to de Loys, was 4 ft., 5 in. It had 32 teeth. It had all the features like the anthropoids in the Old World have and, therefore, Montandon concluded, it must be an anthropoid ape. It would be the only ape native to the Americas — a so-called "missing link" between apes and humans.  He asked de Loys for more details, calculated some measurements by estimating and comparing the size of the box with the body in the picture, and in 1929, convinced de Loys to tell the story to the Illustrated London News (Loys, 1929 op. cit.: Keith, 1929; Heuvelmans, 1959; Hill, 1962). Shortly thereafter, Montandon published his statement in the Journal de la Societe des Americanistes (Montandon, 1929a); then wrote another note which he presented at the French Academy of Sciences in Paris. (Montandon, 1929b). "Montandon went so far as to create a new genus Ameranthropoides for the reception of the new animal, giving it the specific name loysi in honour of its discoverer." (Hill, 1962).
At the meeting of the French Academy of Sciences, Montadon tried to present some convincing "evidence" about his major discovery of the American Ape, a so-far unknown "American version" of the African chimpanzee and gorilla, and the Asian orangutan. He and de Loys – who under Montandon's pressure also tried to support the new discovery hypothesis – had to face numerous questions at the Academy. Naturalists and anthropologists questioned them very suspiciously. They raised many questions about the photograph: the size of the monkey sitting on the box, about her absent tail, her set of only 32 teeth, her spider monkey-like face (Joleaud, 1929), her female sex organ – that resembled that of a female spider monkey. (Female spider monkeys have a long, bulbous clitoris, that people even today often mistake for a penis).

The skepticism and some of the criticisms resulted in heated debates, often ridiculing Montandon's alleged hypothesis as a fraud (Keith, 1929 op. cit.; Heuvelmans, 1959). When Montandon ran out of convincing arguments in order to support his hypothesis, he tried to bring up some anecdotes based on stories of Indian tribes like about the guayazi, the di-di, and the vasitri or "big-devil" that was believed to attack women.

These stories were similar in nature to those that people were attributing to gorillas in Africa (Heuvelmans, 1959). A. de Humboldt, who did not believe any of these stories, attributed these alleged attacks to the spectacled bear (Tremarctos ornatus) and Marquis de Wavrin mentions these creatures as "marimunda" which were later also identified as spider monkeys: Ateles belzebuth (Wendt, 1956; Heuvelmans, 1959; Hill, 1962).

Montandon was defeated in scientific circles, but the story created some ambiguity, which led into more investigations for years to come, and in the mind of some, even today, that there are still some large, mysterious creatures of several kinds, like Bigfoot, and Yeti still roaming the wilderness.

There is also a drawing of a creature by the naturalist George Edwards in A Study of Anthropoid Life.  This primate bears an uncanny resemblance to the one shot by de Loys. The text under the drawing says, "The painter-naturalist Edwards (1758–64) stands as a somewhat notable figure in the history of anthropoid knowledge because in addition to writing a readable popular description of the 'man of the woods' he illustrated it with a figure entitled 'The Satier, Sauage, Wild-man, Pigmy, Orang-outang, Chimp-anzee, A.D. 1757, Geo. Edwards, Delin.et Sculp.,'  in which he so skillfully mingled the structural characters of oran-outan, chimpanzee, and gibbon that one cannot more exactly name the figure than by the synonyms which the artist himself used...It is but natural then that we should find it difficult to think of him as an anthropoid authority."

References

Further reading
 Brian Regal, Human Evolution: A Guide To The Debates, pp. 63–64 (ABC-CLIO, Inc., 2004). 
 Robert Silverberg, Scientists and Scoundrels: A Book of Hoaxes, pp. 178–187 (New York: Crowell, 1965). 
 

1892 births
1935 deaths
20th-century Swiss geologists
Cryptozoology
Hoaxers
Hoaxes in science